Nyaniso Ntsikelelo Dzedze is a South African performing artist. Born (1986) and raised in Johannesburg. The actor, dancer, choreographer, and singer is best known for his lead roles as adult Simba in Beyonce's Disney release Black Is King.

His South African television debut was with his role as Tsietsi Namane on e.tv telenovella Ashes to Ashes.

He was also recognized for his lead role as Muzi in Hear Me Move - South Africa's first dance movie.

He received a nomination for Most Promising Actor at the 12th Africa Movie Academy Awards in Rivers State.

His wife Yana Fay Dzedze is German.

Filmography

Television and film
 Ashes to Ashes
 Generations
 Hear Me Move
 Black Is King
 Binnelanders
 Rhythm City
 Durban Gen

References

External links 
http://www.tvsa.co.za/actors/viewactor.aspx?actorid=17138
http://citizen.co.za/227233/he-likes-to-move-it/
http://www.channel24.co.za/The-Juice/Actor-Nyaniso-Dzedze-on-dealing-with-fame-20150510
http://www.dispatchlive.co.za/news/actors-rise-out-of-the-ashes/
http://ink361.com/app/users/ig-823335260/nyanison/photos
http://www.iol.co.za/tonight/tv-radio/breathing-life-into-his-character-1.1816964

People from Johannesburg
1986 births
South African male television actors
South African male dancers
South African choreographers
Living people